Benin ancestral altars are adorned with some of the finest examples of art from the Benin Kingdom of south-central Nigeria.

The role of ancestral altars in Benin culture
According to anthropologists Kulcher and Melion, art objects or visual images do not merely encode memory but actively engender modes of recollection. A Benin ancestral altar is such a locus for constructing memory. Its purpose was to establish in the most lasting way possible that the deceased had successfully fulfilled his social destiny or akhonmioto. Therefore, the role of the objects on ancestral altars was to construct memory and affirm social identity. Additionally, altars serve as a site through which a living leader communicated with his ancestor via the latter's commemorative head. Ancestral altars ensure dynastic continuity and facilitate the consistent continuity of ideals of leadership.

Paternal ancestral altars, aru erha, consist of a raised mud platform set against a wall. A series of elongated wooden staffs, ukhurhe, rest against the wall. The upper segment of the staff is hollowed out and contains a clapper inside which can be rattled when the staffs are struck on the ground, a gesture that is performed to call the ancestors. The body of the staff is segmented to represent ukhurhoho, a wild plant with short branches that break off when they reach a certain length. As a result, the staff symbolizes a single lifespan, as expressed in the Edo proverb: "If ukhurhoho has not reached the promised day of one's destiny [the day of one's death], it will not break off."

Sumptuary laws govern the shape and composition of ancestral altars, requiring differences between commoners, chiefs and royalty. A comparison of these three types of altar will demonstrate that an increase in socioeconomic and ritual status is paralleled by an increase in the elaborateness of the altar.

Commoners' ancestral altars
The commoners' altar is a mud rectangle surmounted by a long row of rattle staffs, which reflect the activities of generations of senior sons. The staff finials depict a generalized ancestral head, devoid of any marks of status. One or more brass bells are placed in the center of the altar to be rung at the beginning of rituals. Occasionally, the senior son will add decorative elements that relate directly to his father's life.

Chiefly ancestral altars
Chiefly ancestral altars have a similar form to commoner's ancestral altars but are more highly decorated. Specific to chiefly ancestral altars is the wooden commemorative head, or uhunmwun elao, which represents the chief by accurately depicting the regalia of his rank.

Royal ancestral altars
In order to ensure dynastic continuity, a newly installed oba is responsible for creating an altar dedicated to his father and predecessor. The altar holds objects commissioned to honor the leader being commemorated, and thus are adorned and activated on a regular basis with libations of food or animal blood. The oba does the same for his mother if she attained the title of iyoba, or queen mother

Royal altars differ from those of commoners or chiefs. They are round, not rectangular. The surface is fashioned of whitened clay, upon which are displayed rattle staffs, bells, stone celts, brass sculptures of various sizes, and other objects for ritual use.

While bells and rattle staffs are placed on all ancestral altars, ivory tusks and commemorative brass heads are made specifically for royal altars. Associated with trade, ivory and brass are durable and valuable, and their colors—white like sacred kaolin clay and red like fire and coral beads—relate to royal power. The images on the tusks represent former kings, great war chiefs, soldiers, retainers and symbolic animals.

Carved elephant tusks function as a visual bridge between agbon, the material realm, and erinmwin, the world of spirits and ancestors. The whiteness of the ivory tusk is like orhue, a pure, white, kaolin clay considered to be the essence of harmony and spirituality. Orhue is ubiquitous in Edo rituals; it is applied to the faces and bodies of participants in ceremonies, blown into the air in powdered form as purification, painted in sacred designs on shrine floors, and mixed into the food offered to worshipers. In each of these uses, orhue insures calmness, health, and well-being. Orhue is also applied to the surface of the clay altar, which is constructed of symbolically charged earth and water and, in the past, was placed over the grave of the Oba's father. According to Barbara Blackmun, "The whiteness of the ivory tusk therefore enhances the sanctity and effectiveness of the altar. The motifs carved upon the ivories are only one part of a potent ensemble designed to furnish a point of contact not only between the reigning king and his newly- deified predecessor, but also with his ancestral lineage of divine rulers and other spiritual forces guiding the kingdom."

Each large, carved tusk is supported by a heavy pedestal in the form of a crowned head of an Oba made of shining brass. The tusk protrudes upward from the center of the crown. Throughout Edo history, coppery brass has been considered more precious than gold. Before 1897, sumptuary laws limited the use of large, cast objects in copper and its alloys, brass and bronze, to the Oba and one of his highest ranking chiefs.

Altar tableaus
Placed at the center of Benin royal ancestral altars, flanked by ancestor heads supporting the carved ivory tusks, and surrounded by staffs, brass bells, and other objects, in a cast brass tableau of figures standing upon a rectangular base. These altar tableaus (aseberia) depict the oba surrounded by courtiers, chiefs and other attendants who define their position.

History of ancestral altars
The creation of ancestral altars dates to the earliest days of the Benin Kingdom. Altars honor the deceased and commemorate their achievements. They are also important tools for maintaining communication between the living and the dead. As a divine monarch, the oba does not relinquish his influence when he departs this world. Ancestral altars are among the primary means by which a living oba transcends the earthly realm to commune with his predecessors for the good of the kingdom.

In 1897, the Kingdom of Benin was conquered by the British and incorporated into a British colony that eventually became the modern nation of Nigeria. This episode is referred to as the Punitive Expedition of 1897. Oba Ovonramwen, who was crowned in 1888 as the thirty-fifth ruler in his lineage, was sent into lifelong exile. The British confiscated all of the objects from Benin City that they associated with divine kingship, and sent them back to London to be sold. No records were kept of their original location, context, or ownership. In this way, thousands of complex artworks were removed from Benin and dispersed in museums and private collections.

Before the British conquest, an oba's courtyard was the focal point for rituals in his honor. British troops reported 18 altars dedicated to previous obas when they took possession of the palace in 1897. Today, all of the royal altars stand together in a single courtyard.

References

External links
Royal Art of Benin: The Perls Collection, an exhibition catalog from The Metropolitan Museum of Art (fully available online as PDF), which contains material on Benin ancestral altars

Benin Court Art
Altars